Irish Rallycross Championship, IRX, PartsforCars Irish Rallycross Championship is a Rallycross championship in the Republic of Ireland.

The championship is regulated by Motorsport Ireland who are the governing body of Motorsports in the Republic of Ireland.

History 
The Irish Rallycross Championship was formed in 1982, all rounds running in Mondello Park. The event attracted a round of European Rallycross Championship to Ireland in the early 1990s.

2022 season 
With COVID-19 restrictions effectively coming to an end, a full season went ahead in 2022. Championship consisted of 7 rounds, all of them in Mondello Park rallycross circuit.

Calendar

Results

2021 season 
The season started late due to ongoing COVID-19 pandemic. Championship consisted of 5 rounds, all of them in Mondello Park clockwise rallycross circuit.

Calendar

Results

2020 season 
On 12 March all motorsports events were postponed in the light of the coronavirus pandemic. On 20 March, Motorsport Ireland issued a statement that all motorsport events are suspended until 1 June 2020, and later the remainder of the season was cancelled.

Calendar

Results 

The Rallycars class was absent this season. There were total of 48 cars on the grid for the round 1, with Modified being the largest class - 12 cars. Last year's overall champion Derek Tohill did not start in his Supercar Fiesta, but rather in a 2 wheel drive Fiesta in Modified class, and finished third. Round 1 winner was Tommy Graham. All other rounds were called off and the championship was cancelled.

2019 season 
The official 2019 championship media launch took place on 17 February 2019 in Mondello Park. Leo Nulty started the proceedings, stating that the championship is in its best position in many years. PartsforCars was announced as the main championship sponsor, along with sponsorship from Diamondbrite, IPRS, Rigs 4 Gigs and MRCM Roofing.

Round 1 event on 3 March was cancelled in the afternoon after the first semi-finals race due to adverse weather conditions (snow). However, the results were to stand.

On October 15 Mondello Park have announced that the penultimate two rounds scheduled for 19-20 of October will not take place because participant entry numbers are too low for the championship event to go ahead. The entrant numbers have been dropping throughout the season despite organizers' efforts to revive the championship. The Motorsport Ireland Rallycross Commission met the following week in order to make a decision in relation to the final event of the season on 24 November. On 7 November Motorsport Ireland announced that the last round of the season will go ahead, incentivized by lowered entry fees, and the first time ever “race into the night” as the finals would run under floodlights.

Calendar

Results 

The Production Class featured three cars in Round 1, one car in Round 2 and none from Rounds 3 onwards.

2018 season 

The season consisted of 6 rounds, 3 different track layouts and 9 main championship classes.

Sponsors 
PartsforCars has renewed the main sponsorship for another year. PartsforCars were joined by new sponsors Diamondbrite, IPRS ltd, Morris Roofing & Cladding Maintenance and Rigs 4 Gigs.

References

Motorsport competitions in Ireland
Rallycross racing series